Self-help or self-improvement is a self-guided improvement—economically, intellectually, or emotionally—often with a substantial psychological basis.

When engaged in self-help, people often use publicly available information or support groups, on the Internet as well as in person, where people in similar situations join together. From early examples in self-driven legal practice and home-spun advice, the connotations of the word have spread and often apply particularly to education, business, psychology and psychotherapy, commonly distributed through the popular genre of self-help books. According to the APA Dictionary of Psychology, potential benefits of self-help groups that professionals may not be able to provide include friendship, emotional support, experiential knowledge, identity, meaningful roles, and a sense of belonging.

Many different self-help group programs exist, each with its own focus, techniques, associated beliefs, proponents and in some cases, leaders. Concepts and terms originating in self-help culture and Twelve-Step culture, such as recovery, dysfunctional families, and codependency have become firmly integrated in mainstream language.
Groups associated with health conditions may consist of patients and caregivers. As well as featuring long-time members sharing experiences, these health groups can become support groups and clearing-houses for educational material. Those who help themselves by learning and identifying health problems can be said to exemplify self-help, while self-help groups can be seen more as peer-to-peer or mutual-support groups.

History
Within classical antiquity, Hesiod's Works and Days "opens with moral remonstrances, hammered home in every way that Hesiod can think of." The Stoics offered ethical advice "on the notion of eudaimonia—of well-being, welfare, flourishing." The genre of mirror-of-princes writings, which has a long history in Greco-Roman and Western Renaissance literature, represents a secular cognate of Biblical wisdom-literature. Proverbs from many periods, collected and uncollected, embody traditional moral and practical advice of diverse cultures.

The hyphenated compound word "self-help" often appeared in the 1800s in a legal context, referring to the doctrine that a party in a dispute has the right to use lawful means on their own initiative to remedy a wrong.

For some, George Combe's Constitution [1828], in the way that it advocated personal responsibility and the possibility of naturally sanctioned self-improvement through education or proper self-control, largely inaugurated the self-help movement;" In 1841, an essay by Ralph Waldo Emerson, entitled Compensation, was published suggesting "every man in his lifetime needs to thank his faults" and "acquire habits of self-help" as "our strength grows out of our weakness." Samuel Smiles (1812–1904) published the first self-consciously personal-development "self-help" book—entitled Self-Help—in 1859. Its opening sentence: "Heaven helps those who help themselves", provides a variation of "God helps them that help themselves", the oft-quoted maxim that had also appeared previously in Benjamin Franklin's Poor Richard's Almanack (1733–1758).

Early 20th century

In 1902, James Allen published As a Man Thinketh, which proceeds from the conviction that "a man is literally what he thinks, his character being the complete sum of all his thoughts." Noble thoughts, the book maintains, make for a noble person, whilst lowly thoughts make for a miserable person. Several decades later, Napoleon Hill's Think and Grow Rich (1937) described the use of repeated positive thoughts to attract happiness and wealth by tapping into an "Infinite Intelligence".

Around the same time, in 1936, Dale Carnegie further developed the genre with How to Win Friends and Influence People. Having failed in several careers, Carnegie became fascinated with success and its link to self-confidence, and his books have since sold over 50 million copies.

The market
Within the context of the market, group and corporate attempts to aid the "seeker" have moved into the "self-help" marketplace, with Large Group Awareness Trainings, LGATs
and psychotherapy systems represented. These offer more-or-less prepackaged solutions to instruct people seeking their own individual betterment, just as "the literature of self-improvement directs the reader to familiar frameworks...what the French fin de siècle social theorist Gabriel Tarde called 'the grooves of borrowed thought'."

A subgenre of self-help book series also exists: such as the for Dummies guides and The Complete Idiot's Guide to...—compare how-to books.

Statistics 
At the start of the 21st century, "the self-improvement industry, inclusive of books, seminars, audio and video products, and personal coaching, [was] said to constitute a 2.48-billion dollars-a-year industry" in the United States alone. By 2006, research firm Marketdata estimated the "self-improvement" market in the U.S. as worth more than $9 billion—including infomercials, mail-order catalogs, holistic institutes, books, audio cassettes, motivation-speaker seminars, the personal coaching market, weight-loss and stress-management programs. Marketdata projected that the total market size would grow to over $11 billion by 2008. 
In 2012 Laura Vanderkam wrote of a turnover of 12 billion dollars.
In 2013 Kathryn Schulz examined "an $11 billion industry".

Self-help and professional service delivery
Self-help and mutual-help are very different from—though they may complement—service delivery by professionals: note, for example, the interface between local self-help and International Aid's service delivery model.

Conflicts can and do arise on that interface, however, with some professionals considering that "the twelve-step approach encourages a kind of contemporary version of 19th-century amateurism or enthusiasm in which self-examination and very general social observations are enough to draw rather large conclusions."

Research
The rise of self-help culture has inevitably led to boundary disputes with other approaches and disciplines. Some would object to their classification as "self-help" literature, as with "Deborah Tannen's denial of the self-help role of her books" so as to maintain her academic credibility, aware of the danger that "writing a book that becomes a popular success...all but ensures that one's work will lose its long-term legitimacy."

Placebo effects can never be wholly discounted. Thus careful studies of "the power of subliminal self-help tapes...showed that their content had no real effect...But that's not what the participants thought." "If they thought they'd listened to a self-esteem tape (even though half the labels were wrong), they felt that their self-esteem had gone up. No wonder people keep buying subliminal tape: even though the tapes don't work, people think they do." One might then see much of the self-help industry as part of the "skin trades. People need haircuts, massage, dentistry, wigs and glasses, sociology and surgery, as well as love and advice."—a skin trade, "not a profession and a science" Its practitioners would thus be functioning as "part of the personal service industry rather than as mental health professionals." While "there is no proof that twelve-step programs 'are superior to any other intervention in reducing alcohol dependence or alcohol-related problems'," at the same time it is clear that "there is something about 'roguishness' itself which is curative." Thus for example "smoking increases mortality risk by a factor of just 1.6, while social isolation does so by a factor of 2.0...suggest[ING] an added value to self-help groups such as Alcoholics Anonymous as surrogate communities."

Some psychologists advocate a positive psychology, and explicitly embrace an empirical self-help philosophy; "the role of positive psychology is to become a bridge between the ivory tower and the main street—between the rigor of academe and the fun of the self-help movement." They aim to refine the self-improvement field by way of an intentional increase in scientifically sound research and well-engineered models. The division of focus and methodologies has produced several sub fields, in particular: general positive psychology, focusing primarily on the study of psychological phenomenon and effects; and personal effectiveness, focusing primarily on analysis, design and implementation of qualitative personal growth. This includes the intentional training of new patterns of thought and feeling. As business strategy communicator Don Tapscott puts it, "The design industry is something done to us. I'm proposing we each become designers. But I suppose 'I love the way she thinks' could take on new meaning."

Both self-talk, the propensity to engage in verbal or mental self-directed conversation and thought, and social support can be used as instruments of self-improvement, often by empowering, action-promoting messages. Psychologists have designed a series of experiments that are intended to shed light on how self-talk can result in self-improvement. In general, research has shown that people prefer to use second-person pronouns over first-person pronouns when engaging in self-talk to achieve goals, regulate one’s own behavior, thoughts, or emotions, and facilitate performance. If self-talk has the expected effect, then writing about personal problems using language from their friends’ perspective should result in a greater amount of motivational and emotional benefits comparing to using language from their own perspective. When you need to finish a difficult task and you are not willing to do something to finish this task, trying to write a few sentences or goals imaging what your friends have told you gives you more motivational resources comparing to you write to yourself. Research done by Ireland and others have revealed that, as expected, when people are writing using many physical and mental words or even typing a standard prompt with these kinds of words, adopting a friend’s perspective while freely writing about a personal challenge can help increase people’s intention to improve self-control by promoting the positivity of emotions such as pride and satisfaction, which can motivate people to reach their goal.

The use of self-talk goes beyond the scope of self-improvement for performing certain activities, self-talk as a linguistic form of self-help also plays a very important role in regulating people’s emotions under social stress. First of all, people using non-first-person language tend to exhibit a higher level of visual self-distancing during the process of introspection, indicating that using non-first-person pronouns and one’s own name may result in enhanced self-distancing. More importantly, this specific form of self-help also has been found can enhance people’s ability to regulate their thoughts, feelings, and behavior under social stress, which would lead them to appraise social-anxiety-provoking events in more challenging and less threatening terms. Additionally, these self-help behaviors also demonstrate noticeable self-regulatory effects through the process of social interactions, regardless of their dispositional vulnerability to social anxiety.

Criticism
Scholars have targeted many self-help claims as misleading and incorrect. In 2005, Steve Salerno portrayed the American self-help movement—he uses the acronym SHAM: the Self-Help and Actualization Movement—not only as ineffective in achieving its goals but also as socially harmful. "Salerno says that 80 percent of self-help and motivational customers are repeat customers and they keep coming back 'whether the program worked for them or not." Others similarly point out that with self-help books "supply increases the demand…  The more people read them, the more they think they need them… more like an addiction than an alliance."

Self-help writers have been described as working "in the area of the ideological, the imagined, the narrativized… although a veneer of scientism permeates the[ir] work, there is also an underlying armature of moralizing."

Christopher Buckley in his book God Is My Broker asserts: "The only way to get rich from a self-help book is to write one".

In 1976, and a decade later in 1987, Gerald Rosen  raised concerns that psychologists were promoting untested self-help books with exaggerated claims rather than conducting studies that could advance the effectiveness of these programs to help the public. Rosen noted the potential benefits of self-help but cautioned that good intentions were not sufficient to assure the efficacy and safety of self-administered instructional programs. Some 40 years later, Rosen and colleagues have observed that many psychologists continue to promote untested self-help programs, rather than contribute to the meaningful advancement of self-help.

In the media
Kathryn Schulz suggests that "the underlying theory of the self-help industry is contradicted by the self-help industry’s existence".

Parodies and fictional analogies
The self-help world has become the target of parodies. Walker Percy's odd genre-busting Lost in the Cosmos has been described as "a parody of self-help books, a philosophy textbook, and a collection of short stories, quizzes, diagrams, thought experiments, mathematical formulas, made-up dialogue". In their 2006 book Secrets of The SuperOptimist, authors W.R. Morton and Nathaniel Whitten revealed the concept of "super optimism" as a humorous antidote to the overblown self-help book category.  In his comedy special Complaints and Grievances (2001), George Carlin observes that there is "no such thing" as self-help: anyone looking for help from someone else does not technically get "self" help; and one who accomplishes something without help, did not need help to begin with. In Margaret Atwood's semi-satiric dystopia Oryx and Crake, university literary studies have declined to the point that the protagonist, Snowman, is instructed to write his thesis on self-help books as literature; more revealing of the authors and of the society that produced them than genuinely helpful.

See also

 Internal locus of control
 Law of attraction (New Thought)
 Arete
 Napoleon Hill
 Conduct book
 Think and Grow Rich
 New Thought Movement
 Outline of self
 The Secret (2006 film)
 Dale Carnegie
 Personal development
 Preschool education
 Positive psychology
 Self-sustainability
 Self-experimentation
 Self-healing
 Self-taught
 Lucinda Redick Bassett
 Self (psychology)
 Self-help groups for mental health
 Mirror-of-princes writing
 Mutual aid society
 Mutual self-help housing
 Sophism
 Twelve-step program
 List of twelve-step groups
 Individualism
 Law Of Attraction
 Self Awareness
 Live in the Moment
 Manifestation
 Abundance

References

External links

 

Personal development
Self-care